Vera Sergeyevna Moskalyuk (Russian: Вера Сергеевна Москалюк; born 10 November 1981 in Zhytomyr, Ukraine) is a Ukrainian-born Russian judoka. She competed in three consecutive Summer Olympics. In 2004 in Athens in the -78 kg event she was eliminated in her first match by Liu Xia. In Beijing in 2008 she competed again at -78 kg and lost her first match to Esther San Miguel. Finally in London in 2012, still in the -78 kg event she was defeated by Kayla Harrison.

Moskalyuk has won a gold medal (2006) and two silver medals (2007, 2008) at the European Judo Championships.

References

External links
 
 

1981 births
Living people
Russian female judoka
Olympic judoka of Russia
Judoka at the 2004 Summer Olympics
Judoka at the 2008 Summer Olympics
Judoka at the 2012 Summer Olympics
Sportspeople from Zhytomyr
21st-century Russian women